Sherikhel is a village in Lakki Marwat District in Pakistan. It has about 250 houses and six mosques.

In Google Maps satellite its location is latitude 32.4736490 and Longitude 70.6581130.

Sherikhel has four neighborhoods:
 Lajmirkhel
Mangokhel
Diwanikhel
Zainokhel

Lajmirkhel contains the North Forest.  The west side is also forested and contains a lake near Mangokhel and Lajmirkhel. Sherikhel's south hills have natural gas deposits.

Lakki Marwat District